Ryan Brathwaite  (born June 6, 1988) is a track and field athlete from Barbados who won the gold medal in the 110 metres hurdles at the 2009 World Championships in Athletics in Berlin. In recognition of his achievements, on September 17, 2009 Brathwaite was given the honour of being an ambassador while formally receiving the title Ambassador His Excellency Ryan Brathwaite.

He is from the Hillaby district in the parish of St. Andrew. Although he shares a birthplace, surname and speciality with Shane Brathwaite, the two are not related.

Career
He first ran on the world stage at the 2005 World Youth Championships in Athletics, taking the silver medal in the 110 meter hurdles. More success came in regional competition when he won the 2006 CAC Junior Championships. He competed as a senior athlete at the 2007 World Championships in Athletics and he reached the sprint hurdles semi-finals. He also represented Barbados at the 2007 Pan American Games where he finished in fourth place.

Brathwaite set a national record at the 2008 Central American and Caribbean Championships in Athletics, winning his heat in a time of 13.49 seconds and finishing fourth in the final. He improved this further at the 2008 Summer Olympics, running 13.38 seconds in the heats. He made it through to the Olympic semi-finals before being knocked out.

He broke a championship record the following year at the 2009 CAC Championships, which he achieved in the semi-finals. However, he was beaten in the final by the reigning Olympic champion Dayron Robles. At the 2009 World Championships in Athletics, neither Robles nor the defending world champion Liu Xiang were present for the final as they withdrew due to injury. Brathwaite took advantage of this, setting a new best of 13.18 in the semi-finals, and he improved to 13.14 to win the gold and become the 2009 world champion. At 21 years old, he was the youngest ever champion for the event. After the gold medal, he won at the Memorial Van Damme meeting and closed a successful year with another gold at the 2009 IAAF World Athletics Final.

Personal bests

Achievements

See also
Barbados at the Olympics

References

External links

Sportspeople from Bridgetown
1988 births
Living people
Barbadian male hurdlers
Olympic athletes of Barbados
Athletes (track and field) at the 2008 Summer Olympics
Athletes (track and field) at the 2012 Summer Olympics
World Athletics Championships medalists
Barton Cougars men's track and field athletes
Junior college men's track and field athletes in the United States
Athletes (track and field) at the 2014 Commonwealth Games
Commonwealth Games competitors for Barbados
Central American and Caribbean Games gold medalists for Barbados
Competitors at the 2010 Central American and Caribbean Games
World Athletics Championships winners
IAAF World Athletics Final winners
Central American and Caribbean Games medalists in athletics
Athletes (track and field) at the 2007 Pan American Games
Pan American Games competitors for Barbados